IBFA can stand for:

 International Bhojpuri Film Awards
 International Bodybuilding and Fitness Association